Crispen Sachikonye (born 28 March 1969) is a Zimbabwean entrepreneur and co-founder of Hash Three (PVT) Limited, one of Zimbabwe’s largest advertising agencies, which has interests in four internationally-affiliated advertising agencies across three southern African countries. He is also the founder of the independent news agency African Open Media Initiative (Private) Limited, which was licensed in Zimbabwe in July 2010, and in Malawi in November 2010.

Background
Sachikonye received his primary education at Martindale School and Hartmann House Preparatory School; his secondary education at St. George's College, Harare; and further studies in mechanical engineering at the University of Zimbabwe. In 1993 he successfully applied to the Ministry of Women's Affairs for the unbanning of beauty pageants in Zimbabwe, and subsequently produced the Miss Zimbabwe pageant under the Miss World license. He then produced the Miss Universe pageant under a license from same. In 1994 he donated the Miss World pageant franchise to the Miss Zimbabwe Trust, which holds the license to this day.

Sachikonye left Zimbabwe in 1994 and worked in the graphics department at the Swiss Bank Corporation in London for three years. He returned to Zimbabwe in 1997 and teamed up with Vojin Dakovic to build Hash Three as a graphic design company. Sachikoye is part of Team Zimbabwe, a special brand-building unit brought together by the Deputy Prime Minister to define and develop Zimbabwe's brand.

References

External links
BBC programmer
allafrica.com
The Standard article
www.sachikonye.com

1969 births
Living people
Zimbabwean businesspeople
Alumni of St. George's College, Harare